Mariyam Nazima is a Maldivian film actress.

Early life
Mariyam Nazima was born in Male', Maldives. She made her screen debut with an advertisement. Afterwards, she was seen in the video single, "Fennaathee Balanyaa Loabin" directed by Abdulla Shujau and featuring the fitness model, Abdulla, alongside her.

Career
Nazima made her film debut as a confused lover in the Easa Shareef-directed Emme Fahu Dhuvas (1997), starring alongside Reeko Moosa Manik, Hassan Afeef and Niuma Mohamed in which a devious woman sunders her best-friend's upcoming marriage by creating false accusations and staging misleading impressions. She next starred in Mohamed Ali Manik's Maazee (2000) alongside Ismail Wajeeh, Jamsheedha Ahmed and Aminath Rasheedha which narrates the story of two best friends, a boy and a girl, who get separated at childhood and reunite as adults. Nazima played the role of Sama, a secretary who is romantically linked to her boss. Mariyam Shauqee's widely acclaimed family drama television series Kahthiri was released the following year, where she played the role of the tolerable second wife, living in a congested housing complex while dealing with several social issues.

In 2000, Nazima starred alongside Ahmed Asim, Koyya Hassan Manik and Waleedha Waleed in the Haajara Abdul Kareem-directed Ajaaib which depicts the relationship of two exemplary wives and their respective families regardless of societal norms. She next starred opposite Yoosuf Shafeeu and Ali Seezan as a young woman who reluctantly marries a handicapped man, in Mohamed Rasheed's Hithu Vindhu (2000).

In 2001, Nazima starred as Nathasha, longing for her unrequited love in Fathimath Nahula's drama film Naaummeedhu (2000) which depicts the story of a happily married couple whose life is shattered into pieces when they unintentionally invite a seductive woman into their life. The film received favorable reviews from critics and emerged as the highest grossing Maldivian film of the year. It was followed by her role as a money-driven greedy woman alongside Yoosuf Shafeeu, Mariyam Nisha, Moosa Zakariyya and Ahmed Shimau in the Shimau-directed family drama film Loabi Nuvevununama (2002). Penned by Fathimath Nahula, the story narrates the journey of a handicapped man who has been betrayed in love and unknowingly marries his brother's love interest. The film was a critical and commercial success. The following year, she played a supporting role in the Imad Ismail-directed horror film Araamagu Dhonkamana (2003) as a mentally challenged young woman, co-starring Mariyam Shazna, Assadh Shareef and Mohamed Afrah. The film narrates the story of a woman spirit who rises from the sea and marries a toddy extractor, disguised as a human being.

Filmography

Feature Film

Television

References 

Living people
People from Malé
21st-century Maldivian actresses
Maldivian film actresses
Year of birth missing (living people)